King Neptune (May 16, 1942 – May 14, 1950) was a pig used by a United States Navy recruiter to raise $19 million in war bonds (over $308 million in 2019 adjusted for inflation) for the construction of the  between 1942 and 1946.

Origins
King Neptune was born in a litter of 12 on the Sherman Boner farm near West Frankfort, Illinois. Originally named Parker Neptune, in honor of his father Parker Sensation, he was raised by Boner's daughter, Patty, as a 4-H project. Neptune was donated by Sherman Boner on December 5, 1942 and was originally intended to be served at a fundraising pig roast until the local navy recruiter had another idea. Neptune was a Hereford swine, a breed characterized as mostly red, with a white face, ears and at least two white feet, similar to that of the Hereford breed of cattle.

Fund raising efforts
Navy recruiter Don C. Lingle, originally of Anna, Illinois, working at the office in Marion, Illinois, decided to auction the pig to raise war bonds. Lingle and auctioneer L. Oard Sitter traveled throughout southern Illinois auctioning Neptune for bonds for the battleship Illinois which was under construction. Eventually, the individual parts of the pig were auctioned; his squeal was auctioned for $25 on at least one occasion. After each auction, King Neptune was returned to be auctioned again later. High demand for appearances by Neptune led them to travel the rest of Illinois raising funds. The pig, who was mostly red and had white features, was often displayed covered with a blue Navy blanket and wearing a crown and silver earrings.

On March 6, 1943, Illinois Governor Dwight H. Green purchased King Neptune for $1 million on behalf of the state of Illinois. At the same auction, one of Neptune's bristles was sold for $500.

On one occasion in early 1945, a check was written to King Neptune for his upkeep. The bank asked Lingle to obtain the pig's endorsement to cash the checks. Lingle was promoted to Chief Petty Officer as a result of his fund raising efforts with Neptune.

Most of the hog's appearances were sponsored by local Elks clubs and King Neptune was a life member of the chapters at Marion, Illinois, Freeport, Illinois and Harrisburg, Illinois.

Over the course of King Neptune's fundraising career, he, Lingle and Sitter helped raise $19 million in war bonds, equivalent to about $200 million in 2007 adjusted dollars.

Retirement

In 1946, King Neptune was to be sent to the Chicago Stockyards; however, Lingle regained ownership of the pig and placed him on a local farm where he spent the rest of his life.

King Neptune died of pneumonia on Ernest Goddard's farm near Anna, Illinois on May 14, 1950, two days prior to his 8th birthday. He was buried with military honors about six miles (10 km) east of Anna, off Illinois route 146 at a location that became locally known as King Neptune Park. In 1956, Lingle planned to donate an additional  of land around the property for use as a Naval Reserve National Park. However, that plan never materialized, and in 1958 the construction of Interstate 57 forced King Neptune's grave to be temporarily relocated. In 1963, a new location was selected less than a mile east of the I-57 / IL-146 interchange.  In the late 1980s, after the previous monument was heavily vandalized, the state of Illinois placed a second monument commemorating King Neptune at the nearby northbound I-57 rest area.

His original tombstone said:

His birth year was mistakenly listed as 1941 on the first monument, but that was corrected to 1942 on the monument at the I-57 rest area.

Similar efforts
In Oklahoma, a shorthorn steer and "General Grant", a Hereford bull, were also auctioned for around two million dollars each in war bonds.

See also
 List of individual pigs

References

Further reading
 "King Neptune helped the war effort during World War II." Ben Gelman. The Southern. Carbondale, Illinois. May 8, 2003.
 "Exploring the rest of the story of King Neptune." Ben Gelman. The Southern. Carbondale, Illinois. May 22, 2003.

External links
Any Bonds Today? by Beth Py-Lieberman. Smithsonian. February 2002.

Individual pigs
Union County, Illinois
Animal mascots
United States Navy personnel
United States Navy in the 20th century
1942 animal births
1950 animal deaths
Military animals of World War II
Individual animals in the United States